Chalmers Knitting Mills was a historic factory building located at Amsterdam, Montgomery County, New York.  It was built in 1913 and expanded in 1916.

The original section was a four-story, brick building.  The 1916 addition was a seven-story, steel frame and reinforced concrete building with concrete block.  The addition was set at a near-right angle to the original section, giving the building an "L"-shaped footprint.  The mill produced undergarments and remained in operation under the Chalmers name until the founders' death in 1959.

It was added to the National Register of Historic Places in 2010.

The city of Amsterdam was awarded a $1.4 million Restore New York state grant to demolish the factory, which was razed in 2011. The state Department of Environmental Conservation provided $1.9 million to clean up the contamination.

References

Industrial buildings and structures on the National Register of Historic Places in New York (state)
Industrial buildings completed in 1913
Industrial buildings completed in 1916
Buildings and structures demolished in 2011
Buildings and structures in Montgomery County, New York
1913 establishments in New York (state)
National Register of Historic Places in Montgomery County, New York
Demolished buildings and structures in New York (state)